is a Japanese football player currently playing for Suzuka Point Getters in the Japan Football League. He is currently the club's captain.

Career statistics
Updated to 1 October 2022.

References

External links

Profile at Mito HollyHock

1986 births
Living people
People from Kanazawa, Ishikawa
Meiji University alumni
Association football people from Ishikawa Prefecture
Japanese footballers
Japanese expatriate footballers
Association football midfielders
J1 League players
J2 League players
J3 League players
Japan Football League players
Nagoya Grampus players
Mito HollyHock players
Omiya Ardija players
Kawasaki Frontale players
Iwate Grulla Morioka players
Suzuka Point Getters players
Orange County SC players
USL Championship players
Japanese expatriate sportspeople in the United States
Expatriate soccer players in the United States